Giuseppe Buscaglione (August 17, 1868 – 1928) was an Italian painter.

Biography
Buscaglione was born at Ariano di
Puglia (now Ariano Irpino in Campania), to a family originally from Biella in the Piedmont. He was a pupil of Lorenzo Delleani of Biella.  He is known mainly for his landscapes.

He died in 1928 at Rivoli Torinese.

References

1868 births
1928 deaths
People from Ariano Irpino
19th-century Italian painters
Italian male painters
20th-century Italian painters
Italian landscape painters
Painters from Piedmont
19th-century Italian male artists
20th-century Italian male artists